Tsiolkovsky may refer to:

Konstantin Tsiolkovsky (1857–1935), Russian and Soviet rocket scientist
Tsiolkovsky, Amur Oblast (formerly Uglegorsk), Russian town named for Tsiolkovsky
Tsiolkovsky State Museum of the History of Cosmonautics in Kaluga; named for Tsiolkovsky
Tsiolkovsky rocket equation, named for Tsiolkovsky
Tsiolkovsky tower, spacelaunch concept developed by Tsiolkovsky
Tsiolkovsky mission, Soviet space program named for Tsiolkovsky
Tsiolkovskiy Island, Antarctic island named for Tsiolkovsky
Tsiolkovskiy (crater), Moon crater named for Tsiolkovsky
1590 Tsiolkovskaja, asteroid named for Tsiolkovsky

See also
Ziółkowski (surname), Tsiolkovsky's Polish ancestry